"Nova Heart" is a song by the Canadian new wave band Spoons. It was released in May 1982 as the first single from their 1982 album Arias & Symphonies. It was their first song to appear on the Canadian singles chart.

Following the success of the initial 7″ single version of "Nova Heart" (#40 Canada), an extended 12″ single was subsequently released. The B-side, "Symmetry," which did not appear on the Arias & Symphonies album, was a dance single, and while it did not get much airplay, it got significant play in clubs.

Nova Heart was re-released as a 30th Anniversary Edition CD on March 26, 2012. In addition to the "Single version" and the 12 inch Extended Mix of the song, the CD also has 2 new remixes made by the band itself, a demo made in 1981 and a "Live" version of the song recorded at Barrymore's club in Ottawa, Ontario in 1982. This is a limited edition CD.

Nova Heart was covered by Canadian Electro-goth band Johnny Hollow.

The album cover photos were taken at the CN Tower in Toronto, Ontario by Peter Noble.

Track listing
7″ - Ready Records / SR 201X Canada
"Nova Heart" (3:56)
"Symmetry" (3:59)

12″ - Ready Records / SRBH 020 Canada
"Nova Heart" (6:42)
"Symmetry" (6:47)

Chart positions

References

1982 songs
1982 singles
Spoons (band) songs
Song recordings produced by John Punter